Poznański/ Poznanski (feminine: Poznańska/ Poznanska, plural: Poznańscy, also distorted like Poznansky, Posnanski, Posnansky) is a surname of Polish language origin. Poznański surname is derived from the city Poznań.

People 
 Alexander Poznansky (born 1950), Russian-American scholar of the life and works of Pyotr Ilyich Tchaikovsky
 Alicja Poznańska (1930–1990), Polish-Canadian writer
 Alfred 'Savoir' Poznański (1883–1934), French comedy playwright of Polish Jewish origin
 Arthur Posnansky (1873–1946), engineer, explorer, archaeologist
 Christina Poznanska Perks (born 1935), Polish-Canadian architect 
 Daphna Poznanski-Benhamou (1950), French politician
 Gitel (Gertrude) Poznanski Steed (1914–1977), American cultural anthropologist 
 Grzegorz Marek Poznański (born 1971), Polish diplomat and ambassador 
 Gustavus Poznanski (1804–1879), cantor and religious leader, a pioneer of Reform Judaism
 Hanna Poznańska Segal (1918–2011), British psychoanalyst
 Izrael Poznański (1833–1900), Polish-Jewish businessman, textile magnate and philanthropist in Łódź
 Joe Posnanski (born 1967), American sports journalist
  (born 1995), German Frankfurt Galaxy (ELF) player
 Lilly Ogatina Poznanski (1942–1989), politician and educator from the Solomon Islands
 Louis Poznański  (born 1967), German football player
  (born 1984), Polish archeologists and member of Sejm
 Mark J. Poznansky (born 1946), Canadian research scientist and science blogger
 Neil Poznansky (born 1972), Canadian thoroughbred racing jockey 
 Odon Poznański (1149–1194), Duke of Greater Poland
 Renée Poznanski (born 1949), French-born Israeli historian
 Samuel Abraham Poznański (1864–1921), Polish-Jewish scholar
 Ursula Poznanski (born 1968), Austrian writer
 Zofia Poznańska (1906-1942), Polish-Jewish resistance worker
 Zofia Daszyńska-Golińska née Poznańska (1866–1934), Polish socialist politician, suffragist

Places and objects 
 Izrael Poznański Palace, eclecticism 19th-century palace in Łódź, Poland
 Posnansky/Fronius PF-1 White Knight, glider

Poznański being related to Poznań, Poland:
 Poznań County, powiat poznański
 Poznań Department, Departament Poznański
 Poznań protests of 1956, Poznański Czerwiec
 Adam Mickiewicz University in Poznań, Uniwersytet Poznański
 Poznań University of Technology, Politechnika Poznańska

See also 
 
 Posener
Polish-language surnames
Polish toponymic surnames
pl:Poznański
de:Poznanski
fr:Poznanski